Elections to Dacorum Borough Council in Hertfordshire, England were held on 1 May 2003.  The whole council was up for election and the Conservative Party gained overall control after previously relying on the mayor's casting vote for control.  Overall turnout was 32.87%.

Election result

Ward results

References

2003 Dacorum election result
 Ward results with map
Ward results

2003
2003 English local elections
2000s in Hertfordshire